Felix de Latassa y Ortin (November 21, 1733 – April 2, 1805) was Aragonese bibliographer responsible for compiling (in several works) a chronological index of Aragonese writers from the time of the birth of Christ up to his own time.

The bibliographies are often treated in two parts:
 The first, in two large volumes, catalogues Aragonese literature and letters ranging from the years 1 to 1500. 
 The second part, separate volumes that cover from 1500 to his own contemporary age (1802).

Latassa's bibliographies also contain many biographical notes which are a valuable (and sometimes sole) source for many Aragonese historical figures.

Biography 

Latassa was born (and died) in Zaragoza of an Aragonese noble family which had fallen onto hard times. His parents, Juan Latassa y Ortiz (of  Navarre) and Maria Ortin moved to Zaragoza after their marriage in the early eighteenth century. Latassa began studying Arts and Philosophy at the University of Zaragoza in 1749 and gained his bachelor's degree in 1752.  It is also around this time that Latassa took holy orders to become a priest. Despite his pastoral duties, he continued his studies and was awarded a degree in Theology in 1761 with a doctorate in 1762.  
During his life Latassa was employed as a curate at the parish of Juslibol and later as a racionero in the metropolitan church of El Salvador (1780) and later to a sinecure at the Basilica del Pilar in 1782.
He died aged 67 considering his life's work as incomplete, and was interred in the Basilica del Pilar, in the chapel of Saint Vincent.

Works 
His bibliographies by publication date:
 Bibliotheca Antigua de los escritores aragoneses que florecieron desde la venida de Christo hasta el año 1500
 Biblioteca nueva de los escritores aragoneses que florecieron desde el año de 1500 hasta 1599
 Biblioteca nueva de los escritores aragones que florecieron desde el año de 1600 hasta 1640
 Biblioteca nueva de los escritores aragoneses que florecieron desde el año de 1641 hastaa 1680
 Biblioteca nueva de los escritores aragoneses que florecieron desde el año de 1689 hasta el de 1753
 Biblioteca nueva de los escritores aragoneses que florecieron desde el año de 1753 hasta el de 1795

In addition to his bibliographies:
 Memorias de los Racioneros de Mensa de la Santa Iglesia Metropolitana del Salvador

Bibliography 
FATÁS, G. (coord.) Aragoneses Ilustres. (Zaragoza, Caja de Ahorros de la Inmaculada, 1983).
LAMARCA LANGA, G. "Félix Latassa. Apuntes biográficos". (Revista de Historia Jerónimo Zurita, 72 [1997], pp. 185–193).

Notes

References 

Bibliographers
1733 births
1805 deaths